Oxford is a city in England. It is the county town and only city of Oxfordshire. It had a population of 162,100 at the 2021 census. The city is home to the University of Oxford, the oldest university in the English-speaking world; it has buildings in every style of English architecture since late Anglo-Saxon. Oxford's industries include motor manufacturing, education, publishing, information technology and science.

History

The history of Oxford in England dates back to its original settlement in the Saxon period. Originally of strategic significance due to its controlling location on the upper reaches of the River Thames at its junction with the River Cherwell, the town grew in national importance during the early Norman period, and in the late 12th century became home to the fledgling University of Oxford. The city was besieged during The Anarchy in 1142.

The university rose to dominate the town. A heavily ecclesiastical town, Oxford was greatly affected by the changes of the English Reformation, emerging as the seat of a bishopric and a full-fledged city. During the English Civil War, Oxford housed the court of Charles I and stood at the heart of national affairs.

The city began to grow industrially during the 19th century, and had an industrial boom in the early 20th century, with major printing and car-manufacturing industries. These declined, along with other British heavy industry, in the 1970s and 1980s, leaving behind a city which had developed far beyond the university town of the past.

Geography

Physical

Location
The rivers Cherwell and Thames (also sometimes known as the Isis locally, supposedly from the Latinised name ) run through Oxford and meet south of the city centre. These rivers and their flood plains constrain the size of the city centre.

Climate

Oxford has a maritime temperate climate (Köppen: Cfb). Precipitation is uniformly distributed throughout the year and is provided mostly by weather systems that arrive from the Atlantic. The average conditions below are from the Radcliffe Meteorological Station. It boasts the longest series of temperature and rainfall records for one site in Britain. These records are continuous from January 1815. Irregular observations of rainfall, cloud and temperature exist from 1767.

The sunniest month on record is May 2020, with 331.7 hours and December 1890 is the least sunny, with 5.0 hours.

Districts

The city centre 

The city centre is relatively small, and is centred on Carfax, a crossroads which forms the junction of Cornmarket Street (pedestrianised), Queen Street (mainly pedestrianised), St Aldate's and the High Street ("the High"; blocked for through traffic). Cornmarket Street and Queen Street are home to Oxford's chain stores, as well as a small number of independent retailers, one of the longest established of which was Boswell's, founded in 1738. The store closed in 2020. St Aldate's has few shops but several local government buildings, including the town hall, the city police station and local council offices. The High (the word street is traditionally omitted) is the longest of the four streets and has a number of independent and high-end chain stores, but mostly university and college buildings. The historic buildings mean the area is regularly used by film and TV crews.

Suburbs 
Aside from the city centre, there are several suburbs and neighbourhoods within the borders of the city of Oxford, including:

 Barton
 Blackbird Leys
 Cowley
 Temple Cowley
 Iffley
 Littlemore
 Rose Hill
 Cutteslowe
 Headington
 New Marston
 Jericho
 North Oxford
 Park Town
 Norham Manor
 Walton Manor
 Osney
 Risinghurst
 Summertown
 Sunnymead
 Waterways
 Wolvercote

Green belt 

Oxford is at the centre of the Oxford Green Belt, which is an environmental and planning policy that regulates the rural space in Oxfordshire surrounding the city which aims to prevent urban sprawl and minimize convergence with nearby settlements. The policy has been blamed for the large rise in house prices in Oxford, making it the least affordable city in the United Kingdom outside of London, with estate agents calling for brownfield land inside the green belt to be released for new housing. The vast majority of the area covered is outside of the city, but there are some green spaces within that which are covered by the designation such as much of the Thames and river Cherwell flood-meadows, and the village of Binsey, along with several smaller portions on the fringes. Other landscape features and places of interest covered include Cutteslowe Park and the mini railway attraction, the University Parks, Hogacre Common Eco Park, numerous sports grounds, Aston's Eyot, St Margaret's Church and well, and Wolvercote Common and community orchard.

Economy
Oxford's economy includes manufacturing, publishing and science-based industries as well as education, research and tourism.

Car production
Oxford has been an important centre of motor manufacturing since Morris Motors was established in the city in 1910. The principal production site for Mini cars, owned by BMW since 2000, is in the Oxford suburb of Cowley. The plant, which survived the turbulent years of British Leyland in the 1970s and was threatened with closure in the early 1990s, also produced cars under the Austin and Rover brands following the demise of the Morris brand in 1984, although the last Morris-badged car was produced there in 1982.

Publishing
Oxford University Press, a department of the University of Oxford, is based in the city, although it no longer operates its own paper mill and printing house. The city is also home to the UK operations of Wiley-Blackwell, Elsevier and several smaller publishing houses.

Science and technology
The presence of the university has given rise to many science and technology based businesses, including Oxford Instruments, Research Machines and Sophos. The university established Isis Innovation in 1987 to promote technology transfer. The Oxford Science Park was established in 1990, and the Begbroke Science Park, owned by the university, lies north of the city. Oxford increasingly has a reputation for being a centre of digital innovation, as epitomized by Digital Oxford. Several startups including Passle, Brainomix, Labstep, and more, are based in Oxford.

Education

The presence of the university has also led to Oxford becoming a centre for the education industry. Companies often draw their teaching staff from the pool of Oxford University students and graduates, and, especially for EFL education, use their Oxford location as a selling point.

Tourism 

Oxford has numerous major tourist attractions, many belonging to the university and colleges. As well as several famous institutions, the town centre is home to Carfax Tower and the University Church of St Mary the Virgin, both of which offer views over the spires of the city. Many tourists shop at the historic Covered Market. In the summer, punting on the Thames/Isis and the Cherwell is a common practice. As well as being a major draw for tourists (9.1 million in 2008, similar in 2009), Oxford city centre has many shops, several theatres and an ice rink.

Retail 

There are two small shopping malls in the city centre: the Clarendon Centre and the Westgate Centre. The Westgate Centre is named for the original West Gate in the city wall, and is at the west end of Queen Street. Blackwell's Bookshop is a bookshop which claims the largest single room devoted to book sales in the whole of Europe, the Norrington Room (10,000 sq ft).

Brewing
There is a long history of brewing in Oxford. Several of the colleges had private breweries, one of which, at Brasenose, survived until 1889. In the 16th century brewing and malting appear to have been the most popular trades in the city. There were breweries in Brewer Street and Paradise Street, near the Castle Mill Stream. The rapid expansion of Oxford and the development of its railway links after the 1840s facilitated expansion of the brewing trade. As well as expanding the market for Oxford's brewers, railways enabled brewers further from the city to compete for a share of its market. By 1874 there were nine breweries in Oxford and 13 brewers' agents in Oxford shipping beer in from elsewhere. The nine breweries were: Flowers & Co in Cowley Road, Hall's St Giles Brewery, Hall's Swan Brewery (see below), Hanley's City Brewery in Queen Street, Le Mills's Brewery in St. Ebbes, Morrell's Lion Brewery in St Thomas Street (see below), Simonds's Brewery in Queen Street, Weaving's Eagle Brewery (by 1869 the Eagle Steam Brewery) in Park End Street and Wootten and Cole's St. Clement's Brewery.

The Swan's Nest Brewery, later the Swan Brewery, was established by the early 18th century in Paradise Street, and in 1795 was acquired by William Hall. The brewery became known as Hall's Oxford Brewery, which acquired other local breweries. Hall's Brewery was acquired by Samuel Allsopp & Sons in 1926, after which it ceased brewing in Oxford. Morrell's was founded in 1743 by Richard Tawney. He formed a partnership in 1782 with Mark and James Morrell, who eventually became the owners. After an acrimonious family dispute this much-loved brewery was closed in 1998, the beer brand names being taken over by the Thomas Hardy Burtonwood brewery, while the 132 tied pubs were bought by Michael Cannon, owner of the American hamburger chain Fuddruckers, through a new company, Morrells of Oxford. The new owners sold most of the pubs on to Greene King in 2002. The Lion Brewery was converted into luxury apartments in 2002. Oxford's first legal distillery, the Oxford Artisan Distillery, was established in 2017 in historic farm buildings at the top of South Park.

Bellfounding
The Taylor family of Loughborough had a bell-foundry in Oxford between 1786 and 1854.

Buildings

 Christ Church Cathedral, Oxford
 The Headington Shark
 Oxford University Press
 Oxford Botanic Garden
 Sheldonian Theatre
 St. Mary the Virgin Church
 Radcliffe Camera
 Radcliffe Observatory
 Oxford Oratory
 Malmaison Hotel, in a converted prison in part of the medieval Oxford Castle

Parks and nature walks
Oxford is a very green city, with several parks and nature walks within the ring road, as well as several sites just outside the ring road. In total, 28 nature reserves exist within or just outside Oxford ring road, including:

 University Parks
 Mesopotamia
 Rock Edge Nature Reserve
 Lye Valley
 South Park
 C. S. Lewis Nature Reserve
 Shotover Nature Reserve
 Port Meadow
 Cutteslowe Park

Demography

Ethnicity

Religion

Transport

Air
In addition to the larger airports in the region, Oxford is served by nearby Oxford Airport, in Kidlington. The airport is also home to CAE Oxford Aviation Academy and Airways Aviation airline pilot flight training centres, and several private jet companies. The airport is also home to Airbus Helicopters UK headquarters.

Rail–airport links
Direct trains run from Oxford station to  where there is an interchange with the Heathrow Express train links serving Heathrow Airport. Passengers can change at Reading for connecting trains to Gatwick Airport. Some CrossCountry trains run direct services to Birmingham International, as well as to Southampton Airport Parkway further afield.

Buses

Bus services in Oxford and its suburbs are run by the Oxford Bus Company and Stagecoach Oxfordshire as well as other operators including Arriva Shires & Essex and Thames Travel. Oxford has one of the largest urban park and ride networks in the United Kingdom. Its five sites, at Pear Tree, Redbridge, Seacourt, Thornhill, Water Eaton and Oxford Parkway have a combined capacity of 4,930 car parking spaces, served by 20 Oxford Bus Company double decker buses with a combined capacity of 1,695 seats. Hybrid buses began to be used in Oxford in 2010, and their usage has been expanded. In 2014 Oxford Bus introduced a fleet of 20 new buses with flywheel energy storage on the services it operates under contract for Oxford Brookes University. Most buses in the city now use a smartcard to pay for journeys and have free WiFi installed.

Coach
The Oxford to London coach route offers a frequent coach service to London. The Oxford Tube is operated by Stagecoach Oxfordshire and the Oxford Bus Company runs the Airline services to Heathrow and Gatwick airports. There is a bus station at Gloucester Green, used mainly by the London and airport buses, National Express  coaches and other long-distance buses including route X5 to Milton Keynes and Cambridge and Stagecoach Gold routes S1, S2 and S6.

Cycling
Among British cities, Oxford has the second highest percentage of people cycling to work.

Rail

Oxford railway station is half a mile (about 1 km) west of the city centre. The station is served by CrossCountry services to Bournemouth and Manchester Piccadilly; Great Western Railway (who manage the station) services to London Paddington, Banbury and Hereford; and Chiltern Railways services to London Marylebone. Oxford has had three main railway stations. The first was opened at Grandpont in 1844, but this was a terminus, inconvenient for routes to the north; it was replaced by the present station on Park End Street in 1852 with the opening of the Birmingham route. Another terminus, at Rewley Road, was opened in 1851 to serve the Bletchley route; this station closed in 1951. There have also been a number of local railway stations, all of which are now closed.  A fourth station, is just outside the city, at the park and ride site near Kidlington. The present railway station opened in 1852.

Oxford is the junction for a short branch line to Bicester, a remnant of the former Varsity line to Cambridge. This Oxford–Bicester line was upgraded to  running during an 18-month closure in 2014/2015 – and is scheduled to be extended to form the planned East West Rail line to Milton Keynes. East West Rail is proposed to continue through  (for ) to Bedford, Cambridge, and ultimately Ipswich and Norwich, thus providing alternative route to East Anglia without needing to travel via, and connect between, the London mainline terminals.

Chiltern Railways operates from Oxford to London Marylebone via , having sponsored the building of about 400 metres of new track between Bicester Village and the Chiltern Main Line southwards in 2014. The route serves High Wycombe and London Marylebone, avoiding London Paddington and Didcot Parkway.

The distance from Oxford to London was  via Bletchley;  via Didcot and Reading;  via Thame and Maidenhead; and  via Denham.

Only the original route is still in use for its full length, portions of the others remain. There were also routes to the north and west. The line to Witney and Fairford closed in 1962, but the others remain open.

River and canal
Oxford was historically an important port on the River Thames, with this section of the river being called the Isis; the Oxford-Burcot Commission in the 17th century attempted to improve navigation to Oxford. Iffley Lock and Osney Lock lie within the bounds of the city. In the 18th century the Oxford Canal was built to connect Oxford with the Midlands. Commercial traffic has given way to recreational use of the river and canal. Oxford was the original base of Salters Steamers (founded in 1858), which was a leading racing-boatbuilder that played an important role in popularising pleasure boating on the Upper Thames. The firm runs a regular service from Folly Bridge downstream to Abingdon and beyond.

Roads

Oxford's central location on several transport routes means that it has long been a crossroads city with many coaching inns, although road traffic is now strongly discouraged from using the city centre. The Oxford Ring Road or A4142 (southern part) surrounds the city centre and close suburbs Marston, Iffley, Cowley and Headington; it consists of the A34 to the west, a 330-yard section of the A44, the A40 north and north-east, A4142/A423 to the east. It is a dual carriageway, except for a 330-yard section of the A40 where two residential service roads adjoin, and was completed in 1966.

A roads
The main roads to/from Oxford are:
 A34 – a trunk route connecting the North and Midlands to the port of Southampton. Since the completion of the Newbury bypass in 1998, this section of the A34 has been an entirely grade separated dual carriageway.
 A40 – leading east dualled to J8 of the M40 motorway, then an alternative route to High Wycombe and London; leading west part-dualled to Witney then bisecting Cheltenham, Gloucester, Monmouth, Abergavenny, passing Brecon, Llandovery, Carmarthen and Haverfordwest to reach Fishguard.
 A44 – which begins in Oxford, leading past Evesham to Worcester, Hereford and Aberystwyth.
 A420 – which also begins in Oxford and leads to Bristol passing Swindon and Chippenham.

Zero Emission Zone
On 28 February 2022 a zero-emission pilot area became operational in Oxford City Centre. Zero emission vehicles can be used without incurring a charge but all petrol and diesel vehicles (including hybrids) incur a daily charge if they are driven in the zone between 7am and 7pm.

A consultation on the introduction of a wider Zero Emission Zone is expected in the future, at a date to be confirmed.

Bus gates

Oxford has eight bus gates, short sections of road where only buses and other authorised vehicles can pass.

Six further bus gates are currently proposed. A council-led consultation on the traffic filters ended on 13 October 2022. In a decision made on 29 November 2022, Oxfordshire County Council cabinet approved the introduction on a trial basis, for a minimum period of six months. The trial will begin after improvement works to Oxford railway station are complete, which is expected to be by Christmas 2023. The additional bus gates have been controversial; Oxford University and Oxford Bus Company support the proposals but more than 3,700 people have signed an online petition opposing the new traffic filters for Marston Ferry Road and Hollow Way, and hotelier Jeremy Mogford has argued they would be a mistake. In November 2022, Mogford announced that his hospitality group The Oxford Collection had joined up with Oxford Business Action Group (OBAG), Oxford High Street Association (OHSA), ROX (Backing Oxford Business), Reconnecting Oxford, Jericho Traders, and Summertown traders to launch a legal challenge to the new bus gates.

Motorway
The city is served by the M40 motorway, which connects London to Birmingham. The M40 approached Oxford in 1974, leading from London to Waterstock, where the A40 continued to Oxford. When the M40 extension to Birmingham was completed in January 1991, it curved sharply north, and a mile of the old motorway became a spur. The M40 meets the A34 to the north of Oxford.

Education

Schools

Universities and colleges

There are two universities in Oxford, the University of Oxford and Oxford Brookes University, as well as the specialist further and higher education institution Ruskin College that is an Affiliate of the University of Oxford. The Islamic Azad University also has a campus near Oxford. The University of Oxford is the oldest university in the English-speaking world, and one of the most prestigious higher education institutions of the world, averaging nine applications to every available place, and attracting 40% of its academic staff and 17% of undergraduates from overseas. In September 2016, it was ranked as the world's number one university, according to the Times Higher Education World University Rankings. Oxford is renowned for its tutorial-based method of teaching.

The Bodleian Library

The Bodleian Library is a legal deposit library, which means that it is entitled to request a free copy of every book published in the United Kingdom. As such, its collection is growing at a rate of over three miles (five kilometres) of shelving every year.

Media
As well as the BBC national radio stations, Oxford and the surrounding area has several local stations, including BBC Radio Oxford, Heart South, Destiny 105, Jack FM, Jack 2 Hits and Jack 3 & Chill, along with Oxide: Oxford Student Radio (which went on terrestrial radio at 87.7 MHz FM in late May 2005). A local TV station, Six TV: The Oxford Channel, was also available but closed in April 2009; a service operated by That's TV, originally called That's Oxford (now That's Oxfordshire), took to the airwaves in 2015. The city is home to a BBC Television newsroom which produces an opt-out from the main South Today programme broadcast from Southampton.

Local papers include The Oxford Times (compact; weekly), its sister papers the Oxford Mail (tabloid; daily) and the Oxford Star (tabloid; free and delivered), and Oxford Journal (tabloid; weekly free pick-up). Oxford is also home to several advertising agencies. Daily Information (known locally as Daily Info) is an events and advertising news sheet which has been published since 1964 and now provides a connected website. Nightshift is a monthly local free magazine that has covered the Oxford music scene since 1991.

Culture

Museums and galleries 

Oxford is home to many museums, galleries, and collections, most of which are free of admission charges and are major tourist attractions. The majority are departments of the University of Oxford. The first of these to be established was the Ashmolean Museum, the world's first university museum, and the oldest museum in the UK. Its first building was erected in 1678–1683 to house a cabinet of curiosities given to the University of Oxford in 1677. The museum reopened in 2009 after a major redevelopment. It holds significant collections of art and archaeology, including works by Michelangelo, Leonardo da Vinci, Turner, and Picasso, as well as treasures such as the Scorpion Macehead, the Parian Marble and the Alfred Jewel. It also contains "The Messiah", a pristine Stradivarius violin, regarded by some as one of the finest examples in existence.

The University Museum of Natural History holds the university's zoological, entomological and geological specimens. It is housed in a large neo-Gothic building on Parks Road, in the university's Science Area. Among its collection are the skeletons of a Tyrannosaurus rex and Triceratops, and the most complete remains of a dodo found anywhere in the world. It also hosts the Simonyi Professorship of the Public Understanding of Science, currently held by Marcus du Sautoy. Adjoining the Museum of Natural History is the Pitt Rivers Museum, founded in 1884, which displays the university's archaeological and anthropological collections, currently holding over 500,000 items. It recently built a new research annexe; its staff have been involved with the teaching of anthropology at Oxford since its foundation, when as part of his donation General Augustus Pitt Rivers stipulated that the university establish a lectureship in anthropology.

The Museum of the History of Science is housed on Broad Street in the world's oldest-surviving purpose-built museum building. It contains 15,000 artefacts, from antiquity to the 20th century, representing almost all aspects of the history of science. In the university's Faculty of Music on St Aldate's is the Bate Collection of Musical Instruments, a collection mostly of instruments from Western classical music, from the medieval period onwards. Christ Church Picture Gallery holds a collection of over 200 old master paintings. The university also has an archive at the Oxford University Press Museum. Other museums and galleries in Oxford include Modern Art Oxford, the Museum of Oxford, the Oxford Castle, Science Oxford and The Story Museum.

Art
Art galleries in Oxford include the Ashmolean Museum, the Christ Church Picture Gallery, and Modern Art Oxford. William Turner (aka "Turner of Oxford", 1789–1862), was a watercolourist who painted landscapes in the Oxford area. The Oxford Art Society was established in 1891. The later watercolourist and draughtsman Ken Messer (1931–2018) has been dubbed "The Oxford Artist" by some, with his architectural paintings around the city. In 2018, The Oxford Art Book featured many contemporary local artists and their depictions of Oxford scenes. The annual Oxfordshire Artweeks is well-represented by artists in Oxford itself.

Music
Holywell Music Room is said to be the oldest purpose-built music room in Europe, and hence Britain's first concert hall. Tradition has it that George Frideric Handel performed there, though there is little evidence. Joseph Haydn was awarded an honorary doctorate by Oxford University in 1791, an event commemorated by three concerts of his music at the Sheldonian Theatre, directed by the composer and from which his Symphony No. 92 earned the nickname of the "Oxford" Symphony. Victorian composer Sir John Stainer was organist at Magdalen College and later Professor of Music at the university, and is buried in Holywell Cemetery.

Oxford, and its surrounding towns and villages, have produced many successful bands and musicians in the field of popular music. The most notable Oxford act is Radiohead, who all met at nearby Abingdon School, though other well known local bands include Supergrass, Ride, Mr Big, Swervedriver, Lab 4, Talulah Gosh, the Candyskins, Medal, the Egg, Unbelievable Truth, Hurricane No. 1, Crackout, Goldrush and more recently, Young Knives, Foals, Glass Animals, Dive Dive and Stornoway. These and many other bands from over 30 years of the Oxford music scene's history feature in the documentary film Anyone Can Play Guitar?. In 1997, Oxford played host to Radio 1's Sound City, with acts such as Travis, Bentley Rhythm Ace, Embrace, Spiritualized and DJ Shadow playing in various venues around the city including Oxford Brookes University. It is also home to several brass bands, notably the City of Oxford Silver Band, founded in 1887.

Theatres and cinemas 

 Burton Taylor Studio, Gloucester Street
 New Theatre, George Street
 Odeon Cinema, George Street
 Odeon Cinema, Magdalen Street
 Curzon Cinema, Westgate, Bonn Square
 Old Fire Station Theatre, George Street
 O'Reilly Theatre, Blackhall Road
 Oxford Playhouse, Beaumont Street
 Pegasus Theatre, Magdalen Road
 Phoenix Picturehouse, Walton Street
 Ultimate Picture Palace, Cowley Road
 Vue Cinema, Grenoble Road
The North Wall Arts Centre, South Parade
Creation Theatre Company

Literature and film

Well-known Oxford-based authors include:
 Brian Aldiss (1925–2017), science fiction novelist, lived in Oxford.
 Vera Brittain (1893–1970), undergraduate at Somerville.
 John Buchan, 1st Baron Tweedsmuir (1875–1940), attended Brasenose College, best known for The Thirty-nine Steps.
 A.S. Byatt (born 1936), Booker Prize winner, undergraduate at Somerville.
 Lewis Carroll (real name Charles Lutwidge Dodgson), (1832–1898), author of Alice’s Adventures in Wonderland was a student and Mathematical Lecturer of Christ Church.
 Susan Cooper (born 1935), undergraduate at Somerville, best known for her The Dark Is Rising sequence.
 Sir William Davenant (1606–1668), poet and playwright.
 Colin Dexter (1930–2017), wrote and set his Inspector Morse detective novels in Oxford.
 John Donaldson (ca.1921–1989), a poet resident in Oxford in later life.
 Siobhan Dowd (1960–2007), Oxford resident, undergraduate at Lady Margaret Hall.
 Victoria Glendinning (born 1937), undergraduate at Somerville.
 Kenneth Grahame (1859–1932), educated at St Edward's School, wrote The Wind in the Willows.
 Michael Innes (J. I. M. Stewart) (1906–1994), Scottish novelist and academic, Student of Christ Church
 P. D. James (1920–2014), born and died in Oxford; wrote about Adam Dalgliesh
 C. S. Lewis (1898–1963), student at University College and Fellow of Magdalen.
 T. E. Lawrence (1888–1935), "Lawrence of Arabia", Oxford resident, undergraduate at Jesus, postgraduate at Magdalen.
 Iris Murdoch (1919–1999), undergraduate at Somerville and fellow of St Anne's.
 Carola Oman (1897–1978), novelist and biographer, born and brought up in the city.
 Iain Pears (born 1955), undergraduate at Wadham and Oxford resident, wrote  An Instance of the Fingerpost.
 Philip Pullman (born 1946), undergraduate at Exeter, teacher and resident in the city.
 Dorothy L. Sayers (1893–1957), undergraduate at Somerville, wrote about Lord Peter Wimsey.
 J. R. R. Tolkien (1892–1973), undergraduate at Exeter and later professor of English at Merton
 John Wain (1925–1994), undergraduate at St John's and later Professor of Poetry at Oxford University 1973–78.
 Oscar Wilde (1854–1900), 19th-century poet and author who attended Oxford from 1874 to 1878.
 Athol Williams (born 1970), South African poet, postgraduate at Hertford and Regent's Park from 2015 to 2020.
 Charles Williams (1886–1945), editor at Oxford University Press.
Oxford appears in the following works:
 the poems The Scholar Gypsy and Thyrsis by Matthew Arnold. Thyrsis includes the lines: "And that sweet city with her dreaming spires, She needs not June for beauty's heightening,..."
 The Scarlet Pimpernel
 "Harry Potter" (all the films to date)
 The Chronicles of the Imaginarium Geographica by James A. Owen
 Jude the Obscure (1895) by Thomas Hardy (in which Oxford is thinly disguised as "Christminster")
 Zuleika Dobson (1911) by Max Beerbohm
 Gaudy Night (1935) by Dorothy L. Sayers
 Brideshead Revisited (1945) by Evelyn Waugh
 A Question of Upbringing (1951 ) by Anthony Powell
 Alice in Wonderland (1951 ) by Walt Disney
 Second Generation (1964) by Raymond Williams
 Young Sherlock Holmes (1985) by Steven Spielberg
 Inspector Morse (1987–2000)
 Where the Rivers Meet (1988) trilogy set in Oxford by John Wain
 All Souls (1989) by Javier Marías
 The Children of Men (1992) by P. D. James
 Doomsday Book (1992) by Connie Willis
 His Dark Materials trilogy (1995 onwards) by Philip Pullman
 Tomorrow Never Dies (1997)
 The Saint (1997)
 102 Dalmatians (2000)
 Endymion Spring (2006) by Matthew Skelton
 Lewis (2006–15)
 The Oxford Murders (2008)
 Mr. Nice (1996), autobiography of Howard Marks, subsequently a 2010 film
 A Discovery of Witches (2011) by Deborah Harkness
 X-Men: First Class (2011)
 Endeavour (2012 onwards)
 The Reluctant Cannibals (2013) by Ian Flitcroft
 Mamma Mia! Here We Go Again (2018)

Sport

Football

The city's leading football club, Oxford United, are currently in League One, the third tier of league football, though they enjoyed some success in the past in the upper reaches of the league. They were elected to the Football League in 1962, reached the Third Division after three years and the Second Division after six, and most notably reached the First Division in 1985 – 23 years after joining the Football League. They spent three seasons in the top flight, winning the Football League Cup a year after promotion. The 18 years that followed relegation in 1988 saw their fortunes decline gradually, though a brief respite in 1996 saw them win promotion to the new (post Premier League) Division One in 1996 and stay there for three years. They were relegated to the Football Conference in 2006, staying there for four seasons before returning to the Football League in 2010.

They play at the Kassam Stadium (named after former chairman Firoz Kassam), which is near the Blackbird Leys housing estate and has been their home since relocation from the Manor Ground in 2001. The club's notable former managers include Ian Greaves, Jim Smith, Maurice Evans, Brian Horton, Ramon Diaz and Denis Smith. Notable former players include John Aldridge, Ray Houghton, Tommy Caton, Matt Elliott, Dean Saunders and Dean Whitehead. Oxford City F.C. is a semi-professional football club, separate from Oxford United. It plays in the Conference South, the sixth tier, two levels below the Football League in the pyramid. Oxford City Nomads F.C. was a semi-professional football club who ground-shared with Oxford City and played in the Hellenic league.

Rowing
Oxford University Boat Club compete in the world-famous Boat Race. Since 2007 the club has been based at a training facility and boathouse in Wallingford, south of Oxford, after the original boathouse burnt down in 1999. Oxford Brookes University also has an elite rowing club, and there are public clubs near Donnington Bridge, namely the City of Oxford Rowing Club, Falcon Boat Club and Oxford Academicals Rowing Club.

Cricket
Oxford University Cricket Club is Oxford's most famous club with more than 300 Oxford players gaining international honours, including Colin Cowdrey, Douglas Jardine and Imran Khan. Oxfordshire County Cricket Club play in the Minor Counties League.

Athletics
Headington Road Runners are based at the OXSRAD sports facility in Marsh Lane (next to Oxford City F.C.) is Oxford's only road running club with an average annual membership exceeding 300. It was the club at which double Olympian Mara Yamauchi started her running career.

Rugby league
In 2013, Oxford Rugby League entered rugby league's semi-professional Championship 1, the third tier of British rugby league. Oxford Cavaliers, who were formed in 1996, compete at the next level, the Conference League South. Oxford University (The Blues) and Oxford Brookes University (The Bulls) both compete in the rugby league BUCS university League.

Rugby union
Oxford Harlequins RFC is the city's main Rugby Union team and currently plays in the South West Division. Oxford R.F.C is the oldest city team and currently plays in the Berks, Bucks and Oxon Championship. Their most famous player was arguably Michael James Parsons known as Jim Parsons who was capped by England. Oxford University RFC are the most famous club with more than 300 Oxford players gaining International honours; including Phil de Glanville, Joe Roff, Tyrone Howe, Anton Oliver, Simon Halliday, David Kirk and Rob Egerton. London Welsh RFC moved to the Kassam Stadium in 2012 to fulfil their Premiership entry criteria regarding stadium capacity. At the end of the 2015 season, following relegation, the club left Oxford.

Hockey
There are several field hockey clubs based in Oxford. The Oxford Hockey Club (formed after a merger of City of Oxford HC and Rover Oxford HC in 2011) plays most of its home games on the pitch at Oxford Brookes University, Headington Campus and also uses the pitches at Headington Girls' School and Iffley Road. Oxford Hawks has two astroturf pitches at Banbury Road North, by Cutteslowe Park to the north of the city.

Ice hockey
Oxford City Stars is the local Ice Hockey Team which plays at Oxford Ice Rink. There is a senior/adults’ team and a junior/children's team. The Oxford University Ice Hockey Club was formed as an official University sports club in 1921, and traces its history back to a match played against Cambridge in St Moritz, Switzerland in 1885. The club currently competes in Checking Division 1 of the British Universities Ice Hockey Association.

Speedway and greyhound racing

Oxford Cheetahs motorcycle speedway team has raced at Oxford Stadium in Cowley on and off since 1939. The Cheetahs competed in the Elite League and then the Conference League until 2007. They were Britain's most successful club in the late 1980s, becoming British League champions in 1985, 1986 and 1989. Four-times world champion Hans Nielsen was the club's most successful rider. Greyhound racing took place at the Oxford Stadium from 1939 until 2012 and hosted some of the sport's leading events such as the Pall Mall Stakes, The Cesarewitch and Trafalgar Cup. The stadium remains intact but unused after closing in 2012.

American football
Oxford Saints is Oxford's senior American Football team. One of the longest-running American football clubs in the UK, the Saints were founded in 1983 and have competed for over 30 years against other British teams across the country.

Gaelic football
Eire Óg Oxford is Oxford’s local Gaelic Football team. Originally founded as a hurling club by Irish immigrants in 1959, the club plays within the Hertfordshire league and championship, being the only Gaelic Football club within Oxfordshire. Hurling is no longer played by the club; however, Eire Óg do contribute players to the Hertfordshire-wide amalgamated club, St Declans. Several well-known Irishmen have played for Eire Óg, including Darragh Ennis of ITV’s The Chase, and Stephen Molumphy, former member of the Waterford county hurling team.

Religion

Christ Church Cathedral, Oxford
St. Mary the Virgin Church

International relations

Oxford is twinned with:

Bonn, North Rhine-Westphalia, Germany
Grenoble, Auvergne-Rhône-Alpes, France
Leiden, South Holland, Netherlands
Manizales, Caldas Department, Colombia
León, León Department,  Nicaragua
Perm, Perm Krai, Russia (suspended in 2022 after the Russian invasion of Ukraine)
Ramallah, West Bank, Palestine
Wrocław, Silesia,  Poland
Padua, Veneto,  Italy

Freedom of the City
The following people and military units have received the Freedom of the City of Oxford.

Individuals

 Vice Admiral Rt Hon Lord Nelson  : 22 July 1802.
 Rt Hon Lord Valentia : 6 December 1900.
 Admiral of the Fleet Sir Reginald Tyrwhitt : 3 February 1919.
 Admiral of the Fleet Rt Hon Lord Beatty  : 25 June 1919.
 Field Marshal Rt Hon Lord Haig  : 25 June 1919.
 Sir Michael Sadler : 18 May 1931.
 Benjamin R. Jones: 4 September 1942.
 Rt Hon Lord Nuffield : 15 January 1951.
 Rt Hon Sir Robert Menzies : 6 June 1953.
 Alic Halford Smith: 10 February 1955.
 Rt Hon Lord Bicester: 1 March 1955.
 Rt Hon Lord Attlee : 16 January 1956.
 Sir Basil Blackwell: 12 January 1970.
 Olive Gibbs : 17 June 1982.
 Nelson Mandela: 23 June 1997.
 Aung San Suu Kyi: 15 December 1997  (Revoked by Oxford City Council on 27 November 2017).
 Colin Dexter : 26 February 2001.
 Professor Sir Richard Doll : 16 September 2002.
 Sir Roger Bannister : 12 May 2004.
 Sir Philip Pullman : 24 January 2007.
 Professor Christopher Brown : 2 July 2014.
 Benny Wenda: 17 July 2019.

Military units
 Oxfordshire and Buckinghamshire Light Infantry: 1 October 1945.
 1st Green Jackets (43rd and 52nd): 7 November 1958. 
 Royal Green Jackets: 1 January 1966.
 The Rifles: 1 February 2007.

See also

 Bishop of Oxford
 Earl of Oxford
 List of attractions in Oxford
 List of Oxford architects
 Mayors of Oxford
 Oxfam
 Oxford bags
 The Oxfordian Age – a subdivision of the Jurassic Period named for Oxford

References

Citations

Sources

Further reading

External links

 
 Oxford City Council official website
 Thames Valley Guide – Oxford

 
Cities in South East England
County towns in England
Oxford
Local authorities adjoining the River Thames
Local government in Oxfordshire
Populated places established in the 8th century
Oxford
Non-metropolitan districts of Oxfordshire
8th-century establishments in England
Towns in Oxfordshire
 
Boroughs in England